Mount GEC is a mountain located in the Sunwapta River Valley of Jasper National Park. The mountain was named in 1961 after the first names of the three climbers who made the first ascent — George Ellen Chuck.

See also 
 List of mountains in the Canadian Rockies

References

Mountains of Jasper National Park
Three-thousanders of Alberta
Winston Churchill Range